Philip Tomasino (born July 28, 2001) is a Canadian professional ice hockey centre for the  Nashville Predators of the National Hockey League (NHL). He was drafted 24th overall by the Predators in the first round of the 2019 NHL Entry Draft.

Playing career

Junior

Niagara IceDogs
Tomasino was drafted by the Niagara IceDogs of the Ontario Hockey League in the first round, fifth overall, at the 2017 OHL Priority Draft. He had previously played minor midget hockey for the Mississauga Rebels. Tomasino played in his first game with the IceDogs on September 23, 2017, earning an assist in a 4–1 victory over the Hamilton Bulldogs. On October 19, Tomasino scored his first career OHL goal, as he scored against Jacob Ingham of the Mississauga Steelheads in a 6–3 win. In 61 games during the 2017–18 season, Tomasino scored five goals and 24 points. On March 2, 2018, Tomasino was named  Central Division Academic Player of the Month for February

Tomasino saw his offensive production increase in his second season with the IceDogs in 2018–19. On September 29, Tomasino earned four assists in 6–1 win over the North Bay Battalion. Tomasino recorded his first multi-goal game of his OHL career on November 17, scoring twice in a 6–3 victory over the Erie Otters. Tomasino set a career high for points in a game, as on December 15, he scored two goals and added three assists in a 6–2 win over the Oshawa Generals. In 67 games with the IceDogs, Tomasino scored 34 goals and 72 points. On March 26, Tomasino earned his first career OHL playoff goal, as he scored twice against Christian Propp of the Battalion, and added an assist in a 6–0 win. In 11 post-season games, Tomasino scored four goals and seven points.

Tomasino returned to the IceDogs for the 2019–20 season, as he was named an assistant captain. On October 4, Tomasino scored his first career OHL hat-trick, as he scored three goals, and added three assists, for his first career six point game, in an 8–4 win over the Kingston Frontenacs. On January 2, Tomasino scored a goal and added four assists in a 9–8 overtime victory over the North Bay Battalion. On January 9, the IceDogs traded Tomasino to the Oshawa Generals for David Guicciradi, a 2nd-round selection in 2020, a 2nd-round selection in 2021, 3 2nd-round selections in 2023, 1 2nd-round selection in 2024, a 3rd round selection in 2024 and a 4th round selection in 2020 and 2024.  In 36 games with the IceDogs, Tomasino scored 22 goals and 57 points.

Oshawa Generals
Tomasino finished the 2019–20 season with the Oshawa Generals following a mid-season trade with the Niagara IceDogs. Tomasino played his first game with the Generals on January 9, as he scored two goals and added three assists for a five-point game in a 6–3 win over the Windsor Spitfires. Tomasino's first goal with the Generals was against Xavier Medina. On January 25, Tomasino recorded his second five-point game with Oshawa, as he scored a goal and added four assists in a 7–4 win over the Kingston Frontenacs. In 26 games with Oshawa, Tomasino scored 18 goals and 43 points. Overall, between the Niagara IceDogs and his time with Oshawa, Tomasino scored 40 goals and 100 points in 62 games, as he ranked fourth in OHL scoring during the regular season.

Professional

Nashville Predators
Tomasino was drafted by the Nashville Predators in the first round, 24th overall, at the 2019 NHL Entry Draft, held at Rogers Arena in Vancouver, British Columbia. He was later named an alternate captains for the 2019–20 OHL season. Tomasino was signed by the Predators to a three-year, entry-level contract on October 21, 2019.

Career statistics

Regular season and playoffs

International

References

External links

2001 births
Canadian ice hockey centres
Canadian people of Italian descent
Chicago Wolves players
Ice hockey people from Ontario
Living people
Milwaukee Admirals players
Nashville Predators draft picks
Nashville Predators players
National Hockey League first-round draft picks
Niagara IceDogs players
Oshawa Generals players
Sportspeople from Mississauga